James Bradley (1693–1762), was an English astronomer.

James Bradley may also refer to:

Entertainment
James Bradley (author) (born 1954), American historical nonfiction author
James Bradley (Australian writer) (born 1967), Australian novelist and critic
James Bradley Jr., professional drummer and member of Crazy Town
Jim Bradley, a character in 1,000 Dollars a Minute

Sports
James Bradley (footballer) (1881–1954), English footballer
James Bradley (cricketer) (1913–2001), English cricketer
James Bradley (basketball) (born 1955), American basketball player
Jim Bradley (athletics coach) (1921–2015), Scottish athletics coach
Jim Bradley (basketball) (1952–1982), American basketball player
Jim Bradley (American football) (1932–2015), American football coach

Other
James A. Bradley (1830–1921), developer of Asbury Park and Ocean Grove, New Jersey
James B. Bradley (1858–1940), Michigan Auditor General
James Chester Bradley (1884–1975), American entomologist
James Opelton Bradley (born 1962), American serial killer
Jim Bradley (journalist) (1904–1991), British journalist and trade unionist
Jim Bradley (British Army officer) (1911–2003), British POW
James Bradley (former slave) (c. 1810—after 1837), participated in famous debates on slavery
Jim Bradley (politician) (born 1945), Canadian politician
Jim Bradley (trade unionist) (1827–1929), General Secretary of the Fireman's Trade Union (now Fire Brigades Union)

See also
Bradley James (disambiguation)